Noortje de Brouwer (born 9 March 1999) is a Dutch synchronized swimmer. She competed in the 2020 Summer Olympics. Her twin sister Bregje is her usual partner in pairs events.

References

1999 births
Living people
Synchronized swimmers at the 2020 Summer Olympics
Dutch synchronized swimmers
Olympic synchronized swimmers of the Netherlands
Dutch twins
Twin sportspeople